The thirty-first and final series of the British television drama series Grange Hill began broadcasting on 14 April 2008, before ending on 15 September 2008 on BBC One. The series follows the lives of the staff and pupils of the eponymous school, an inner-city London comprehensive school. It consists of twenty episodes, and was shown one episode per week for the first time in the show's history.

Cast

Pupils

Teachers

Others

Episodes

DVD release
The thirty-first and final series of Grange Hill has yet to be released on DVD.

Notes

References

2008 British television seasons
Grange Hill